was a daimyō of the Hatakeyama clan of Kawachi Province during the late Sengoku period of Japanese history.

In 1562, He led Hatakeyama clan at Battle of Kyōkōji, it was one of many battles fought between the Miyoshi and Hatakeyama in Japan's Sengoku period. On 19–20 May of that year, the battle was won by Miyoshi Nagayoshi over Hatakeyama Takamasa.

Daimyo
Hatakeyama clan
1527 births
1576 deaths